Nanum may refer to:
 Nanum (king), a king of the Akkadian Empire who ascended the throne in 2257 BC
 Nanum, Queensland, a place in Far North Queensland, Australia
 Nanum Kodeeswaran, the Tamil title of the 2008 British film Slumdog Millionaire
 Nanum font, a unicode font designed especially for the Korean-language script
 Nanum (bicosoecid), a genus of heterokonts

See also
 Nanu (disambiguation)
 Nana (disambiguation), the feminine form of the word
 Nanus (disambiguation), the masculine form of the word